Ethics or moral philosophy is a branch of philosophy that involves systematizing, defending, and recommending concepts of right and wrong conduct. The field of ethics, along with aesthetics, concern matters of value, and thus comprise the branch of philosophy called axiology.

The following outline is provided as an overview of and topical guide to ethics.

Branches 
The following examples of questions that might be considered in each field illustrate the differences between the fields:
 Descriptive ethics: What do people think is right?
 Normative ethics (prescriptive): How should people act?
 Applied ethics: How do we take moral knowledge and put it into practice?
 Meta-ethics: What does "right" even mean?

Applied ethics 
Applied ethics – using philosophical methods, attempts to identify the morally correct course of action in various fields of human life.
 Economics and business
 Business ethics – concerns questions such as the limits on managers in the pursuit of profit, or the duty of 'whistleblowers' to the general public as opposed to their employers.
 Development ethics (economic development)
 Ethics in management
 Ethics in pharmaceutical sales
 Lifeboat ethics (economic metaphor)
 Bioethics – concerned with identifying the correct approach to matters such as euthanasia, or the allocation of scarce health resources, or the use of human embryos in research.
 Ethics of cloning
 Veterinary ethics
 Neuroethics – ethics in neuroscience, but also the neuroscience of ethics
 Utilitarian bioethics
 Organizational ethics – ethics among organizations.
 Professional ethics
 Accounting ethics – study of moral values and judgments as they apply to accountancy.
 Archaeological ethics –
 Computer ethics – deals with how computing professionals should make decisions regarding professional and social conduct.
 Ten Commandments of Computer Ethics
 Engineering ethics
 Journalism ethics and standards
 Research ethics
 Internet research ethics
 Legal ethics
 Marketing ethics
 Media ethics
 Medical ethics (aka clinical ethics)
 Evidence-based medical ethics
 Military medical ethics
 Nursing ethics
 Ethics of technology
 Technoethics – the ethics of technology in society
 Ethics of terraforming
 Cyberethics
 Ethics of artificial intelligence
 Machine ethics – the moral behavior of artificial moral agents
 Roboethics – the moral behavior of humans as they design, construct, use and treat artificially intelligent beings
 Internet ethics
 Information ethics
 Social ethics – ethics among nations and as one global unit.
 Population ethics
 Sexual ethics
 Bridge ethics – codes of ethics applied during play of the card game known as contract bridge.
 Environmental ethics – concerned with issues such as the duties of humans towards landscapes and species.
 Animal rights – also known as animal liberation, is the idea that the most basic interests of non-human animals should be afforded the same consideration as the similar interests of human beings.
 Climate ethics – concerned with the ethical dimensions of climate change, and concepts such as climate justice.
 Environmental virtue ethics
 Trail ethics
 Ethics of eating meat
 Public sector ethics
 Government ethics
 Ethics in public administration
 International Ethics – in international relations
 Regulatory ethics

Meta-ethics

 Meta-ethics or moral epistemology– concerns the nature of moral statements, that is, it studies what ethical terms and theories actually refer to.
 Moral nihilism – the meta-ethical view that nothing is intrinsically moral or immoral (see also nihilism)
 Moral syncretism – the attempt to reconcile disparate or contradictory moral beliefs, often while melding the ethical
practices of various schools of thought.
 Moral relativism and relativism
 Fallibilism – the philosophical principle that human beings could be wrong about their beliefs, expectations, or their understanding of the world
 Moral skepticism – a class of metaethical theories all members of which entail that no one has any moral knowledge
 Particularism
 Rationalism
 Conventionalism
 Axiology
 Formal ethics
 Rationality
 Discourse ethics – discovering ethical values through argument
 Ethics of justice
 Lawrence Kohlberg's stages of moral development
 Evolutionary ethics
 Neuroethics – ethics in neuroscience, but also the neuroscience of ethics
 Situated ethics – a view of applied ethics in which abstract standards from a culture or theory are considered to be far less important than the ongoing processes in which one is personally and physically involved

Non-cognitivism 
Non-cognitivism
 Emotivism
 Prescriptivism

Cognitivism 
Cognitivism
 Philosophical realism
 Naturalism
 Ethical subjectivism
 Moral realism
 Universalisability

Normative ethics 
Normative ethics – concerns what people should believe to be right and wrong.
 Consequentialism – moral theories that hold that the consequences of one's conduct are the true basis for any judgement about the morality of that conduct. Thus, a morally right act (or omission) is one that will produce a good outcome (the end justifies the means).
 Utilitarianism
 Deontological ethics – approach that judges the morality of an action based on the action's adherence to a rule or rules.
 Moral absolutism – view that certain actions are absolutely right or wrong, regardless of their circumstances such as their consequences or the intentions behind them. Thus stealing, for instance, might be considered to be always immoral, even if done to promote some other good (e.g., stealing food to feed a starving family), and even if it does in the end promote such a good.
 Graded absolutism
 Pragmatic ethics
 Virtue ethics – describes the character of a moral agent as a driving force for ethical behavior.
 Aristotelian ethics – the beginning of ethics as a subject, in the form of a systematic study of how individuals should best live. Aristotle believed one's goal should be living well and "eudaimonia", a Greek word often translated as "well-being" or "happiness".  This could be achieved by the acquisition of a virtuous character, or in other words having well-chosen excellent habits.
 Nicomachean Ethics – most popular ethics treatise by Aristotle
 Eudemian Ethics
 Magna Moralia
 Eudaimonism – system of ethics that measures happiness in relation to morality.
 Ethics of care – a normative ethical theory
 Ethical egoism – the normative ethical position that moral agents ought to do what is in their own self-interest
 Living Ethics
 Religious ethics
 Divine command theory – claims that ethical sentences express the attitudes of God. Thus, the sentence "charity is good" means "God commands charity".
 Ethics in the Bible
 Ayyavazhi ethics
 Buddhist ethics
 Buddhist ethics (discipline)
 Christian ethics
 Situational ethics, a Christian ethical theory
 Islamic ethics
 Islamic bioethics
 Jain ethics
 Jewish ethics
 Jewish business ethics
 Jewish medical ethics
 Religious values
 Playing God (ethics)
 Spalding Professor of Eastern Religion and Ethics
 Ethics and religious culture – a course taught in all elementary and high schools in Quebec
 Religious views on business ethics
 Ethics (Scientology)
 Ethics of circumcision
 Secular ethics
 Biocentrism (ethics) – an ethical point of view which extends inherent value to non-human species,[1] ecosystems, and processes in nature
 Altruism (ethics) – an ethical doctrine that holds that individuals have a moral obligation to help, serve, or benefit others, if necessary at the sacrifice of self-interest
 Rights ethics (thought in the American and French Revolutions)
 Feminist ethics

Descriptive ethics
 Descriptive ethics
 Moral psychology

Related areas 
 Value theory
 Philosophy of economics
 Political philosophy
 Philosophy of law
 Deontic logic
 Religious ethics
 Action theory
 Practical reasoning
 Morality
 Moral character
 Visual ethics
 Ethics of belief

History 

 History of ethics in Ancient Greece
 History of business ethics
 History of animal rights
 History of animal testing
 History of medical ethics
 History of computer ethics
 Contemporary ethics

Concepts

Single principles
 Autonomy
 Egalitarianism
 Golden Rule
 Harm principle
 Liberty
 Positive liberty
 Negative liberty
 Non-aggression principle

Rights and legal concepts

 Consent
 Human rights
 Just War
 Justice
 Natural and legal rights
 Political freedom
 Rights
 Rule according to higher law

Guidelines and basic concepts
 Good and evil
 Good
 Evil
 Commensurability (ethics)
 Ideal (ethics)
 Moral responsibility
 Norm (philosophy)
 Principle
 Self-interest
 Sin
 Taboo
 Universal code (ethics)
 Value (ethics)
 Extrinsic value or instrumental value
 Intrinsic value (animal ethics)
 Intrinsic value (ethics)
 Vice
 Virtue

Human experience
 Conscience
 Free will
 Guilt (emotion)
 Happiness
 Love
 Moral emotions
 Shame
 Suffering

Practical ethics
 Dual loyalty (ethics)
 Evasion (ethics)
 Trust (social sciences)

Law 
 Communist Party of China 52 code of ethics
 List of ECHR cases concerning legal ethics
 Enron Code of Ethics
 Ethics in Government Act
 Medical Code of Ethics
 Native American Graves Protection and Repatriation Act
 UN Principles of Medical Ethics

Government agencies 
 Canadian House of Commons Standing Committee on Access to Information, Privacy and Ethics
 Commission on Federal Ethics Law Reform
 Committee on Publication Ethics
 District of Columbia Board of Elections and Ethics
 Ethics & Religious Liberty Commission
 Ethics Commission
 Ethics Commissioner (Canada)
 Ethics Committee (European Union)
 Ethics committee (disambiguation)
 Federal Ethics Committee on Non-Human Biotechnology
 International Bioethics Committee
 International Ethics Standards Board for Accountants
 Jeffersonville Ethics Commission
 Nevada Commission on Ethics
 Office of Congressional Ethics
 Oklahoma Ethics Commission
 Pennsylvania State Ethics Commission
 San Francisco Ethics Commission
 Texas Ethics Commission
 The President's Council on Bioethics
 Toi Te Taiao: The Bioethics Council – New Zealand council on bioethnics, 2002-9
 United States House Committee on Ethics
 United States Office of Government Ethics
 United States Senate Select Committee on Ethics

Awards 
 Nobel Peace Prize
 Payne Award for Ethics in Journalism

Organizations 
 Carnegie Council for Ethics in International Affairs
 Center for Ethics at Yeshiva University
 Center for Religion, Ethics and Social Policy
 Center for bioethics and medical humanities
 Centre for Applied Ethics
 Centre for Applied Philosophy and Public Ethics
 Centre for Human Bioethics
 Centre for Values, Ethics and the Law in Medicine
 Citizens for Responsibility and Ethics in Washington
 Cumberland School of Law's Center for Biotechnology, Law, and Ethics
 Ethics AdviceLine for Journalists
 Ethics Resource Center
 Ethics and Democracy Network
 Ethics and Excellence in Journalism Foundation
 Ethics and Public Policy Center
 Feminist Approaches to Bioethics
 Foundation for Thought and Ethics
 Institute for Business and Professional Ethics
 Institute for Ethics and Emerging Technologies
 Institute for Global Ethics
 Institute for Science, Ethics and Innovation
 Institute of Business Ethics
 International Neuroethics Society
 International Society for Environmental Ethics
 Johns Hopkins Berman Institute of Bioethics
 Kenan Institute for Ethics
 Kennedy Institute of Ethics
 Kennedy Institute of Ethics Journal
 Kirby Laing Institute for Christian Ethics
 Maguire Center for Ethics
 Markkula Center for Applied Ethics
 National Catholic Bioethics Center
 National Core for Neuroethics
 National Tribunal of Journalistic Ethics
 Nihon Ethics of Video Association
 Nuffield Council on Bioethics
 School for Ethics and Global Leadership
 Society for Business Ethics
 Society of Jewish Ethics
 St James Ethics Centre
 Standard Ethics Aei – sustainability rating agency based in Brussels
 The Soderquist Center for Leadership and Ethics

Persons influential in the field of ethics 

 Confucius (551–479 BCE)
 Socrates (469–399 BCE)
 Plato (424/423–348/347 BCE)
 Aristippus (c. 435–356 BCE)
 Aristotle (384–322 BCE)
 Mencius (c. 372–289 BCE)
 Epicurus (341–270 BCE)
 Jesus (7–2 BCE – 30–36 CE)
 Epictetus (55–135 CE)
 Augustine of Hippo (354–430)
 Thomas Aquinas (1225–1274)
 Baruch Spinoza (1632–1677)
 David Hume (1711–1776)
 Immanuel Kant (1724–1804)
 Jeremy Bentham (1748–1832)
 Georg W. F. Hegel (1770–1831)
 Arthur Schopenhauer (1788–1860)
 John Stuart Mill (1806–1873)
 Søren Kierkegaard (1813–1855)
 Henry Sidgwick (1838–1900)
 William James (1842–1910)
 Friedrich Nietzsche (1844–1900)
 John Dewey (1859–1952)
 Mohandas Karamchand Gandhi (1869–1948)
 G. E. Moore (1873–1958)
 Paul Tillich (1886–1965)
 Karl Barth (1886–1968)
 J. L. Mackie (1917–1981)
 G.E.M. Anscombe (1919–2001)
 Philippa Foot (1920–2010)
 John Rawls (1921–2002)
 Bernard Williams (1929–2003)
 Alasdair MacIntyre (born 1929)
 Thomas Nagel (born 1937)
 Derek Parfit (born 1942)
 Peter Singer (born 1946)
 Jonathan Dancy (born 1946)

Events
 Asilomar Conference on Recombinant DNA
 Ethics Bowl
 Foucault–Habermas debate concerning power within society

Publications 
 Ethics in America – television series, 1988–89
 Lindner Ethics Complaint of the 83rd Minnesota Legislative Session

Books 
 Nicomachean Ethics – most popular ethics treatise by Aristotle
 Eudemian Ethics
 Magna Moralia
 Encyclopaedia of Religion and Ethics
 Encyclopedia of Ethics
 Ethics, Institutions, and the Right to Philosophy
 Ethics (book)
 Life sciences, ethics and democracy
 How to Observe Morals and Manners
 The Ethics of Ambiguity
 The Ethics of Liberty
 The Methods of Ethics
 Principia Ethica
 The Right and the Good
 Rationality and Power: Democracy in Practice
 Practical Ethics

Journals 
 American Journal of Bioethics
 Bioethics
 Business Ethics Quarterly
 Business and Professional Ethics Journal
 Cambridge Quarterly of Healthcare Ethics
 Environmental Ethics
 Ethics & International Affairs
 Ethics (journal)
 Ethics and Language
 Experiments in Ethics
 IRB: Ethics & Human Research
 Journal of Business Ethics
 Journal of Business Ethics Education
 Journal of Empirical Research on Human Research Ethics
 Journal of Ethics & Social Philosophy
 Journal of Information Ethics
 Journal of Medical Ethics
 Legal Trends in Bioethics
 Narrative Inquiry in Bioethics
 Neuroethics
 Notre Dame Journal of Law, Ethics & Public Policy
 Professional Ethics
 Religion & Ethics Newsweekly
 Teaching Ethics
 The Economics and Ethics of Private Property
 The Freedom Paradox: Towards a Post-Secular Ethics
 The Journal of Ethics

See also 
 Index of ethics articles
 Outline of philosophy
 Resources for clinical ethics consultation – index article

References

External links 

 Ethics, 2d ed., 1973. by William Frankena
 Ethics Bites Open University podcast series podcast exploring ethical dilemmas in everyday life.
 University of San Diego – Ethics glossary Useful terms in ethics discussions
 National Reference Center for Bioethics Literature World's largest library for ethical issues in medicine and biomedical research
 The Philosophy of Ethics on Philosophy Archive

Ethics
Ethics
Outline